Christian Gottlob Hubert (1714–1793) was a famous builder of keyboard instruments. Today, he is best known as a clavichord maker. Some of his instruments have been preserved in the collection at Bad Krozingen.

References

German musical instrument makers
German music history
1714 births
1793 deaths
History of musical instruments
Piano makers